Siphoninus is a genus of whiteflies in the family Aleyrodidae.

Species
 Siphoninus gruveli Cohic, 1968
 Siphoninus immaculatus Heeger, 1856
 Siphoninus phillyreae Haliday, 1835

References

Sternorrhyncha genera
Whiteflies